Calderglen Country Park is a country park in the town of East Kilbride, South Lanarkshire, Scotland. It is situated along the eastern edge of the town and is its principal greenspace and recreation area.

Description
The park opened officially in 1982 and features a small zoo, children's play facilities, display and exhibition venues, a tropical hothouse, and several sports clubs including Torrance Golf Club.

The visitor centre and adjoining facilities are based in the 17th-century Torrance House – a Category A listed building – and the remains of its adjoining landscaped policies.

The central area of the park is approached from the old entrance lodge house via the tree-lined driveway of the old estate. The park comprises the gorge portions of the once much more extensive Calderwood and Torrance Estates, with Calderwood Glen occupying the northernmost stretch of the Rotten Calder Water, and Torrance Glen the southern part. Several miles of nature trails run through the park (some prone to landslips), with the longest routes running along the western banks from Flatt in the south to the Hamilton to East Kilbride Expressway (A725) in the north. The northern part of the park is a site of special scientific interest for is carboniferous geology, and the river features a number of waterfalls along its course. The designated woodland within the park totals .

Calderglen is situated near to the industrial suburb of Kelvin, the established residential district of St. Leonards and a small 21st century development, Crutherland.

Gallery

Recreational Facilities
 Mini zoo, featuring small animals such as meerkats, prairie dogs and owls outdoors, and reptiles and fish in a tropical glasshouse
 Ornamental gardens and pond with a chilling statue of Falstaff (previously located at Castlemilk House in Glasgow - Castlemilk and Torrance House were both owned for centuries by the Stuart family)
 Football facility K-Park Training Academy and small stadium which is home to East Kilbride F.C.
 Rugby grounds which are home to East Kilbride RFC
 Tennis facilities operated by East Kilbride Lawn Tennis Club
 Cricket pitch, home to East Kilbride Cricket Club formed in 1962
 Torrance House Golf Club opened in 1969, available for public bookings
 Woodland walks through glens and gorges formed by the Rotten Calder river near to the Calderwood residential district, including the site of Calderwood Castle
 Modern outdoor playground for children
 Gift shop and cafe within the historic Torrance House

References

External links

Calderglen Sports Hub
Torrance House Golf Course 
South Lanarkshire Council park profile 
VisitScotland park profile

Zoos in Scotland
Country parks in Scotland
Areas of East Kilbride
Urban public parks
Buildings and structures in East Kilbride
Parks in South Lanarkshire
Sites of Special Scientific Interest in Clydesdale and South East Glasgow
1982 establishments in Scotland